Wilmer Francisco Difo (born April 2, 1992) is a Dominican professional baseball utility infielder in the New York Yankees organization. Difo made his MLB debut in 2015 with the Washington Nationals and has also played for the Pittsburgh Pirates. He has made the majority of his major league appearances as a second baseman, shortstop, or third baseman, with more limited stints as an outfielder.

Career

Washington Nationals
Difo signed with the Washington Nationals as an international free agent on June 3, 2010. He made his professional debut that season for the Dominican Summer League Nationals. From 2010 to 2013, he played for the Gulf Coast Nationals, Auburn Doubledays, Hagerstown Suns and Potomac Nationals. Difo played the 2014 season with Hagerstown. He was named the 2014 South Atlantic League Most Valuable Player (MVP) with a .315 batting average, a .360 on-base percentage and a .470 slugging average, with 14 home runs and 90 runs batted in. He received the Bob Boone Award from the Nationals, which "recognizes professionalism and passion". Difo started 2015 with the Potomac Nationals and was promoted to the Double-A Harrisburg Senators after 19 games.

On May 19, 2015, Difo was called up to the major leagues for the first time and collected his first hit in his first at-bat the same day, a pinch-hit single up the middle off New York Yankees reliever David Carpenter. Difo hit his first career home run on September 29, 2016, off Arizona Diamondbacks starter and former Nationals pitching prospect Robbie Ray. On October 14, 2016, he struck out for the game's last out as a pinch hitter as the Los Angeles Dodgers defeated the Nationals 4-3 to win the National League Division Series.

Difo received his first career start in the outfield on June 24, 2017, playing center field against the Cincinnati Reds due to an injury to regular center fielder Michael A. Taylor. After Trea Turner suffered a broken wrist in a game days later, Difo took over as the Nationals' regular starting shortstop, occasionally sharing duties with Stephen Drew and Adrián Sánchez. On July 27, 2017, Difo hit one of four consecutive home runs by Nationals hitters off Milwaukee Brewers starter Michael Blazek, the first time the feat had been accomplished in Major League Baseball since the 2011 season.

Splitting time between the Majors and Minors in 2019, Difo appeared in 43 games with the Nationals and had a .252 average with two home runs and eight RBIs. The Nationals finished the year with a 93-69 record, able to clinch a wild card spot. Difo did not play in the postseason, but was on the Nationals' 40-man roster when the team won the 2019 World Series over the Houston Astros, their first championship in franchise history.

On September 5, 2020, Difo was designated for assignment by the Nationals. He cleared waivers and was assigned to the team's alternate training site in Fredericksburg, Virginia. Difo elected free agency on October 13, 2020.

Pittsburgh Pirates

On January 15, 2021, Difo signed a minor league contract with the Pittsburgh Pirates organization. On April 4, 2021, Difo was selected to the 40-man roster to fill in for Ke'Bryan Hayes, who was suffering from left wrist inflammation. On May 22, 2021, against the Atlanta Braves, Difo pitched one inning in a blowout, giving up eight runs on six hits, including a grand slam. It was his first career pitching appearance. On June 8, Difo was designated for assignment after posting a .244/.287/.366 batting line in 44 games for the Pirates. He was outrighted to the Triple-A Indianapolis Indians on June 12. Difo was re-selected to the active roster on July 2. Difo hit .269/.329/.384 with 4 home runs and 24 RBI in 116 games for the Pirates. On November 6, 2021, Difo was outrighted from the 40-man roster and elected free agency the next day.

Arizona Diamondbacks
On March 19, 2022, Difo signed a minor league contract with the Arizona Diamondbacks. On September 1, Difo's contract was selected and was promoted to the major league roster.

On September 12, Difo was designated for assignment. On September 19, he cleared waivers, but elected free agency.

New York Yankees
On December 23, 2022, Difo signed a minor league deal with the New York Yankees.

Personal life
During the 2017 season, Difo attracted some media attention for his choice of walk-up music, as he frequently had romantic ballads like "Unchained Melody" and "My Girl" added to his rotation. Although some of Difo's teammates told The Washington Post they assumed someone was playing a joke on the young infielder, Difo explained to the paper, "I love those songs."

Difo chose to go by the nickname El Lindo, Spanish for "the beautiful one", for MLB Players' Weekend in 2017. The nickname was reportedly given to him by Nationals teammate Adam Lind.

References

External links

1992 births
Living people
Águilas Cibaeñas players
Arizona Diamondbacks players
Auburn Doubledays players
Dominican Republic expatriate baseball players in the United States
Dominican Summer League Nationals players
Gigantes del Cibao players
Gulf Coast Nationals players
Hagerstown Suns players
Harrisburg Senators players
Indianapolis Indians players
Major League Baseball outfielders
Major League Baseball players from the Dominican Republic
Major League Baseball second basemen
Major League Baseball shortstops
Major League Baseball third basemen
Pittsburgh Pirates players
Potomac Nationals players
Syracuse Chiefs players
Washington Nationals players